The Malta women's national baseball team is the national baseball team of Malta. The team represents Malta in women's international competitions. It is governed by the Malta Baseball and Softball Association  (MABS), and is also a member nation of the Confederation of European Baseball.

References

Baseball
National baseball teams in Europe
National baseball teams
Women's national baseball teams
WBSC Europe